The karate competitions at the 2018 Mediterranean Games took place on 23 and 24 June at the Cambrils Pavilion in Cambrils.

Athletes competed in 10 weight categories.

Medal table

Medalists

Men

Women

 Ana Drašković of Montenegro originally won the silver medal, but was disqualified for doping violations.

References

External links
2018 Mediterranean Games – Karate
Results (Archived version)

Sports at the 2018 Mediterranean Games
2018
Mediterranean Games